Sha'arei Tsedek North London Reform Synagogue, a member of the Movement for Reform Judaism, is a synagogue in Whetstone in the London Borough of Barnet. Founded in 1961, it was previously known as Southgate and District Reform Synagogue.

Its principal rabbi is Shulamit Ambalu.

See also
 List of Jewish communities in the United Kingdom
 List of former synagogues in the United Kingdom
 Movement for Reform Judaism

References

External links

1961 establishments in England
Buildings and structures in the London Borough of Barnet
Jewish organizations established in 1961
Reform synagogues in the United Kingdom
Religious organizations established in 1961
Synagogues in London
Whetstone, London